Debra Mullins  (born 12 February 1957) is the president of the Queensland Court of Appeal. She has served on the Supreme Court of Queensland since 2000, and was elevated to the Court of Appeal in 2020. She was appointed as senior counsel in and for the State of Queensland in 2008.

Mullins attended Coorparoo State High School (now Coorparoo Secondary College) for her secondary education. Mullins graduated from the University of Queensland with a BCom (1977), an LL.B. (1980) and a Master of Laws (1999).

In 2014, Mullins was appointed as the deputy chancellor of the Anglican Diocese of Brisbane, and was appointed as the chancellor of the diocese in 2014.

Mullins was appointed an Officer of the Order of Australia (AO) in the 2019 Queen's Birthday Honours for "distinguished service to the law, and to the judiciary, to professional development and legal education, and to women".

References

Judges of the Supreme Court of Queensland
Australian women judges
Australian King's Counsel
1957 births
Living people
Officers of the Order of Australia